Judith Arundell Wright (31 May 191525 June 2000) was an Australian poet, environmentalist and campaigner for Aboriginal land rights. She was a recipient of the Christopher Brennan Award.

Biography
Judith Wright was born in Armidale, New South Wales. The eldest child of Phillip Wright and his first wife, Ethel, she spent most of her formative years in Brisbane and Sydney. Wright was of Cornish ancestry. After the early death of her mother, she lived with her aunt and then boarded at New England Girls' School after her father's remarriage in 1929. After graduating, Wright studied Philosophy, English, Psychology and History at the University of Sydney. At the beginning of World War II, she returned to her father's station (ranch) to help during the shortage of labour caused by the war.

Wright's first book of poetry, The Moving Image, was published in 1946 while she was working at the University of Queensland as a research officer. Then, she had also worked with Clem Christesen on the literary magazine Meanjin, the first edition of which was published in late 1947. In 1950 she moved to Mount Tamborine, Queensland, with the novelist and abstract philosopher Jack McKinney. Their daughter Meredith was born in the same year. They married in 1962, but Jack was to live only until 1966.

In 1966, she published The Nature of Love, her first collection of short stories, through Sun Press, Melbourne. Set mainly in Queensland, they include 'The Ant-lion', 'The Vineyard Woman', 'Eighty Acres', 'The Dugong', 'The Weeping Fig' and 'The Nature of Love', all first published in The Bulletin. Wright was nominated for the 1967 Nobel Prize for Literature.

With David Fleay, Kathleen McArthur and Brian Clouston, Wright was a founding member and, from 1964 to 1976, president, of the Wildlife Preservation Society of Queensland. In 1991, she was the second Australian to receive the Queen's Gold Medal for Poetry, in 1991.

She was involved in the Poets Union.

For the last three decades of her life, Wright lived near the New South Wales town of Braidwood. She moved to the Braidwood area to be closer to H. C. "Nugget" Coombs, her lover of 25 years, who was based in Canberra.

Wright started to lose her hearing in her mid-20s and became completely deaf by 1992.

Poet and critic
Wright was the author of collections of poetry, including The Moving Image, Woman to Man, The Gateway, The Two Fires, Birds, The Other Half, Magpies, Shadow and Hunting Snake. Her work is noted for a keen focus on the Australian environment, which began to gain prominence in Australian art in the years following World War II. She deals with the relationship between settlers, Indigenous Australians and the bush, among other themes. Wright's aesthetic centres on the relationship between mankind and the environment, which she views as the catalyst for poetic creation. Her images characteristically draw from the Australian flora and fauna, yet contain a mythic substrata that probes at the poetic process, limitations of language, and the correspondence between inner existence and objective reality.

Wright's poems have been translated into a number of languages, including Italian, Japanese and Russian. Along with Brendan Kennelly, she is the most featured poet in The Green Book of Poetry, a large ecopoetry anthology by Ivo Mosley (Frontier Publishing 1993), which was published by Harper San Francisco in 1996 as Earth Poems: Poems from Around the World to Honor the Earth.

Birds
In 2003, the National Library of Australia published an expanded edition of Wright's collection titled Birds. Most of these poems were written in the 1950s when she was living on Tamborine Mountain in southeast Queensland. Meredith McKinney, Wright's daughter, writes that they were written at "a precious and dearly-won time of warmth and bounty to counterbalance at last what felt, in contrast, the chilly dearth and difficulty of her earlier years". McKinney goes on to say that "many of these poems have a newly relaxed, almost conversational tone and rhythm, an often humorous ease and an intimacy of voice that surely reflects the new intimacies and joys of her life". Despite the joy reflected in the poems, however, they also acknowledge "the experiences of cruelty, pain and death that are inseparable from the lives of birds as of humans ... and [turn] a sorrowing a clear-sighted gaze on the terrible damage we have done and continue to do to our world, even as we love it".

Environmentalism and social activism
Wright was well known for her campaigning in support of the conservation of the Great Barrier Reef and Fraser Island. With some of her 
friends, she helped found one of the earliest nature conservation movements. She was also an impassioned advocate for the Aboriginal land rights movement. Tom Shapcott, reviewing With Love and Fury, her posthumous collection of selected letters published in 2007, comments that her letter on this topic to the Australian prime minister John Howard was "almost brutal in its scorn". Shortly before her death, she attended a march in Canberra for reconciliation between non-indigenous Australians and the Aboriginal people.

Awards
 1976 – Christopher Brennan Award
 1991 – Queen's Gold Medal for Poetry
 1994 – Human Rights and Equal Opportunity Commission Poetry Award for Collected Poems
In 2009 as part of the Q150 celebrations, Judith Wright was announced as one of the Q150 Icons of Queensland for her role as an "Influential Artists".

Death and legacy
Wright died in Canberra on 25 June 2000, aged 85.

In June 2006 the Australian Electoral Commission (AEC) announced that the new federal electorate in Queensland, which was to be created at the 2007 federal election, would be named Wright in honour of her accomplishments as a "poet and in the areas of arts, conservation and indigenous affairs in Queensland and Australia". However, in September 2006 the AEC announced it would name the seat after John Flynn, the founder of the Royal Flying Doctor Service, due to numerous objections from people fearing the name Wright may be linked to disgraced former Queensland ALP MP Keith Wright. Under the 2009 redistribution of Queensland, a new seat in southeast Queensland was created and named in Wright's honour; it was first contested in 2010.

The Judith Wright Arts Centre in Fortitude Valley, Brisbane, is named after her.

On 2 January 2008, it was announced that a future suburb in the district of Molonglo Valley, Canberra would be named "Wright". There is a street in the Canberra suburb of Franklin named after her, as well. Another of the Molonglo Valley suburbs was named after Wright's lover, "Nugget" Coombs.

The Judith Wright Award was awarded as part of the ACT Poetry Award by the ACT Government between 2005 and 2011, for a published book of poems by an Australian poet.

The Judith Wright Poetry Prize for New and Emerging Poets (worth ), was established in 2007 by Overland magazine.

The Judith Wright Calanthe Award has been awarded as part of the Queensland Premier's Literary Awards since 2004.

Selected bibliography

Poetry

Collections
 
 Woman to Man (1949)
 Woman to Child (1949)
 The Old Prison (1949)
 
 The Gateway (1953)
 Hunting Snake (1964)
 Bora Ring (1946)
 South of My Days  (1946)
 The Two Fires (1955)
 Australian Bird Poems (1961)
 Birds: Poems, Angus and Robertson, 1962; 
 Five Senses: Selected Poems (1963)
 Selected Poems (1963)
 Tentacles: A tribute to those lovely things (1964)
 Sportsfield
 City Sunrise (1964)
 The Other Half (1966)
 The Nature of Love(1966)
 Collected Poems (1971)
 Alive: Poems 1971–72 (1973)
 Poets On Record 9 (University of Queensland Press, 1973) Selected works, issued with a 7" record of Wright reading her own poems.
 Fourth Quarter and Other Poems (1976)
 Train Journey (1978)
 The Double Tree: Selected Poems 1942–76 (1978)
 Phantom Dwelling (1985)
 A Human Pattern: Selected Poems (1990) 
 The Flame Tree (1993)
 Bullocky (1993)
Collected poems, 1942–1985, Angus & Robertson, 1994, 
Poemas escogidos, Pre-textos, 2020,   (Spanish translation by José Luis Fernández Castillo)

List of poems

Literary criticism
 William Baylebridge and the modern problem (Canberra University College, 1955)
 Charles Harpur (1963)
 Preoccupations in Australian Poetry (1965)
 
 
 Because I Was Invited (1975)
 Going on Talking (1991)

Other works
 Kings of the Dingoes (1958) Oxford University Press, Melbourne
 The Generations of Men (1959) 
 Range the Mountains High (1962)
 The Nature of Love (1966) Sun Books, Melbourne
 "The Battle of the Biosphere" (Outlook magazine article 1970)
 "'Witnesses of spring: unpublished poems of Shaw Neilson, edited by Wright, with poems selected by Wright and Val Vallis, from material selected by Ruth Harrison (1970)
 The Coral Battleground (1977)
 The Cry for the Dead (1981)
 We Call for a Treaty (1985)
 
 Half a Lifetime (Text, 2001) 
 Judith Wright: Selected Writings (2022) ed. Georgina Arnott, La Trobe University Press & Black Inc 

Letters
 The Equal Heart and Mind: Letters between Judith Wright and Jack McKinney. Edited by Patricia Clarke and Meredith McKinney (UQP, 2004) 
 With Love and Fury: Selected letters of Judith Wright, edited by Patricia Clarke and Meredith McKinney (National Library of Australia, 2006) 
 Portrait of a friendship: the letters of Barbara Blackman and Judith Wright, 1950–2000, edited by Bryony Cosgrove (Miegunyah Press, 2007) , 

See also

List of Australian poets
 With Love and Fury 2016 album by Brodsky Quartet and Katie Noonan, setting words of Wright to music

References
McKinney, Meredith (2004) "Birds", National Library of Australia News, XIV (6): 7–10, March 2004

Further reading
Arnott, Georgina (2016) The Unknown Judith Wright, UWAP 
Brady, Veronica (1998) South of My Days: A Biography of Judith Wright'', Angus & Robertson

External links
 Poems at Oldpoetry.com
 Judith Wright digital story, educational interview and oral history. John Oxley Library, State Library of Queensland, 12 June 2013. 6min, 36min and 56min version available to view online.
 Vale Judith Wright Interview at Radio National
 Gardening at the 'Edge': Judith Wright's desert garden, Mongarlowe, New South Wales by Katie Holmes
 Judith Wright's Biography: A Delicate Balance between Trespass and Honour by Veronica Brady
 Uncertain Possession: The Politics and Poetry of Judith Wright by Gig Ryan
 The Judith Wright Centre of Contemporary Arts Website
 Two Fires: Festival of Arts and Activism Celebration of Judith Wright's legacy
 Sue King-Smith 'Ancestral Echoes: Spectres of the Past in Judith Wright's Poetry' JASAL Special Issue 2007

1915 births
2000 deaths
Australian environmentalists
Australian women environmentalists
Australian human rights activists
Women human rights activists
Australian literary critics
Australian women literary critics
Australian nature writers
People from Armidale
Australian people of Cornish descent
Deaf poets
Women science writers
Writers from Brisbane
Writers from Sydney
Australian women poets
20th-century Australian women writers
20th-century Australian poets
Australian deaf people
Australian women artists